Brandon Sumrall (born July 15, 1986) is a former American football cornerback. He was signed by the Minnesota Vikings as an undrafted free agent in 2008. He played college football at Southern Mississippi.

Sumrall has also been a member of the Tampa Bay Buccaneers, Indianapolis Colts and New York Giants.

External links
Just Sports Stats
Southern Miss Golden Eagles bio
Indianapolis Colts bio

1986 births
Living people
Players of American football from Mississippi
American football cornerbacks
American football safeties
Southern Miss Golden Eagles football players
Minnesota Vikings players
Tampa Bay Buccaneers players
Indianapolis Colts players
New York Giants players
Las Vegas Locomotives players
People from Perry County, Mississippi